V/H/S: Viral is a 2014 American found footage horror anthology film produced by Bloody Disgusting. The third installment in the V/H/S franchise, created by Brad Miska, features a series of found footage shorts written and directed by Nacho Vigalondo, Marcel Sarmiento, Gregg Bishop, Justin Benson and Aaron Scott Moorhead.

V/H/S: Virals segments include the story of an amateur videographer who have obsession with filming everything; a deranged illusionist who obtains a magical object of great power; a homemade machine that opens a door to a parallel world and teenage skaters who unwittingly become targets of a Mexican death cult ritual. An additional segment was filmed, but Todd Lincoln's short, Gorgeous Vortex, was cut at the last minute since it did not fit in with the overall theme of the film. The short is included as an extra on the film's DVD and Blu-ray release, which starts after the credits for the main film end.

Plot

Vicious Circles/frame narrative (Prologue) 
 Directed by Marcel Sarmiento
 Written by T.J. Cimfel, David White and Marcel Sarmiento

Kevin, an amateur videographer, constantly shoots footage of his girlfriend Iris. At first, she claims to enjoy it, but then grows annoyed and concerned with her boyfriend's obsession with filming her. It also becomes apparent that Kevin uses his videography as a coping mechanism for living with his abusive grandmother, who at one point bloodies his nose off-screen. Later that night, the high-speed pursuit of an ice-cream truck arrives in his neighborhood. Kevin witnesses the chase as it is broadcast on television, and sees the opportunity to create a viral video. He is too late to shoot footage, watching the truck speed past his house, though he sees Iris wander outside in a daze after receiving a mysterious video call, then disappearing when his back is turned. After witnessing the truck run over a cop that had asked him to back away from the road, Kevin chases after the truck, egged on by images of a panicking Iris broadcast to his cell phone. Kevin's  continued pursuit of the truck as it repeatedly circles the neighborhood carries on throughout the film, during which people receive strange images on their cell phones that cause them to become violently insane. The film transitions to the first segment.

Dante the Great 
 Directed and written by Gregg Bishop

This segment is partially framed as an investigative documentary, with interviews of magic experts, theater critics, law enforcement officials, and the main character interspersed throughout the story.

John McMullen, a trailer park resident and untalented illusionist, discovers a cloak that was once owned by Harry Houdini. John discovers that wearing the cloak grants him the power to perform actual magic. Taking on the stage name "Dante the Great", John uses his newfound abilities to perform in front of large audiences, becoming immensely famous. However, John learns that the cloak requires regular human sacrifices to work. To that end, he hires a series of female assistants and videotapes them as he utters an incantation and watches the cloak devour them. He also uses his powers to summon and kill Clay Bowland, the abusive boyfriend of Scarlett Kay, his latest assistant. When Scarlett discovers John's collection of tapes in a secret compartment in his dressing room, she alerts the police, though John is able to use his powers to escape custody. As she is interrogated by a detective, John uses his newfound powers to summon her from the police station. A SWAT team bursts in to arrest John, but John manages to use his magic to kill all of them. He proceeds to duel with Scarlett over the magic cloak. Though Scarlett is briefly able to take it from him, John overpowers her and recovers it.  Before John can kill her, Scarlett uses a trick he taught her to immobilize him, prompting the cloak to feed on him instead. Scarlett burns the cloak, only to find it in her house, hanging on her closet door. As she investigates it, a pair of demonic arms reach out from inside the cloak and grab her.

Vicious Circles (Interlude 1) 
Returning to the frame story, Kevin and the police continue pursuing the truck. A group of teenagers attempt to film the chase from atop a nearby bridge, with one of them staring at his phone in a trance while his nose bleeds. Another one of the teenagers ends up slipping and falling from the bridge when he gets too close, being run over in the process. Kevin is halted by a group of cyclists, but they end up helping him pursue the truck when one of them is caught on it, has his feet shredded to the bone, and is ultimately killed. Despite this, Kevin continues his mission to save Iris. The film transitions to the next segment.

Parallel Monsters 
 Directed and written by Nacho Vigalondo
In Spain, Alfonso, an inventor, works late on his newest project, promising his wife Marta that he will come to bed soon. His project is revealed to be a prototype interdimensional portal. Upon activating the portal, it opens to reveal what appears to be his garage. Alfonso witnesses a copy of himself look at him from the other side, revealing that the portal has successfully opened a gateway to a parallel world. The two versions of Alfonso cautiously greet each other, overcome by curiosity, and discover that they appear to be completely identical. The two agree to trade places, and cross through the portal with their own cameras to explore and document each other's worlds for 15 minutes. As Alfonso explores the alternate version of his house, it would seem that the two worlds are exact mirrored duplicates. Alfonso then encounters the parallel version of Marta, who introduces him to two men both named Oriol. In the living room, a pornographic snuff film plays on the television and a sack of organs is displayed in the center of the room. The parallel Marta prompts Alfonso to perform a ceremony with the Orioles. Disturbed, Alfonso leaves the house and witnesses a large blimp with an inverted cross that blares demonic chanting, revealing that the two worlds hold differing dominant religions. When he attempts to record the blimp, he gets spotted by the two Orioles, who chase Alfonso before catching him. Their eyes and mouth turn bright red, and one of the Orioles takes his pants off to reveal that he has a fanged creature in place of a penis. Back in normal world, the parallel Alfonso discovers Marta asleep, growing aroused and taking photos of her before unveiling his own monstrous genitalia, scaring Marta awake. In the parallel world, Alfonso manages to stab the Oriol's penis with a screwdriver and flees back to the house, where the parallel Marta takes off her robe to reveal that she has a similarly demonic vagina. Terrified, Alfonso punches her and flees back to his world. The parallel Alfonso, covered in blood after his encounter with Marta, stabs his normal self. The parallel Marta appears and devours the parallel Alfonso with her fanged vagina before the original Alfonso closes the portal. Marta, also covered in blood, stabs Alfonso to death after thinking that he savagely attacked her.

Vicious Circles (Interlude 2) 
Returning to the frame story, Kevin continues to pursue the truck as it continues to circle the neighborhood, begging the police to help him save Iris. Meanwhile, a group of Hispanic gangbangers are holding a barbeque to celebrate one of their own being released from prison. Seeing the police helicopter that has been broadcasting the chase, one of them assumes that his girlfriend has turned him in. Suddenly, the music playing on the radio warps and turns operatic, causing the guest of honor to become violent and murder the others by stabbing them with forks. As the truck and Kevin pass, it is revealed that a gas tank has ruptured in the chaos, causing the party to go up in an enormous fireball. The film transitions to the last segment.

Bonestorm 
 Directed by Justin Benson and Aaron Scott Moorhead
 Written by Justin Benson
Jason and Danny are a pair of skateboarders in Los Angeles who perform various stunts in the hopes of creating an epic skateboard video. The videographer they hired, Taylor, pushes them into increasingly dangerous circumstances in the hopes that they injure or kill themselves so he can film the aftermath and sell it as a snuff film. After they start a fight at a local skatepark, the skaters become bored. Taylor suggests they continue the film shoot in Tijuana, remembering that he heard about a prime skating location for them to finish their video. Taylor calls out to their friend Shaun, and rope him into joining him in their trip to Mexico by paying for everything with his dad's credit card. After enjoying themselves and buying fireworks, the skaters subsequently become lost and run into a mysterious woman. Once they find a suitable place, an old flood channel, Taylor encourages them to perform more stunts. When one of the skateboarders injures himself and bleeds on a large pentagram drawn on the ground, his blood quickly boils, despite the apparent normal temperature of the pavement on which the pentagram is drawn. The skaters discover the woman they met earlier standing nearby. As Taylor introduces himself and offers to film her, she suddenly tears his arm off. Immediately after, a group of cloaked cultists, who were using the channel as a site for demonic worship, discover the skaters and attack them. Using a pistol, their skateboards, and any other weapons they can get their hands on, the skateboarders kill the cultists, though Taylor is set on fire while Shaun is stabbed by one of the cultists and bleeds out during the fight. As a demonic roar sounds, the dead cultists rise as reanimated skeletons and mount a second attack. During the second attack, Jason and Danny use the fireworks they bought earlier to destroy several of the skeletons. The two proceed to skate back toward the border as the creature the cultists were attempting to summon appears from a storm drain, who picks up and kills the wounded Taylor by eating him along with his camera.

Vicious Circles (Interlude 3) 
Returning to the frame story, the news broadcasting the chase is warning that several fires have broken out across the city. Kevin still continues to chase the truck, at one point encountering a woman in a trance with her nose bleeding. Kevin tries to get a taxicab to stop, but the driver refuses to. The driver also helps his friend, a porn director, film a striptease with a young woman in the backseat. Suddenly, the woman pulls a gun on him, revealing that the director had previously been sold pornographic footage of her by her ex, and the exposure had apparently ruined her life. She forces him to strip by threatening to shoot his crotch. The director fights back, strangling her, but all three are killed when a police car flips through the air and crushes the taxi. The film transitions to the epilogue.

Vicious Circles (Epilogue) 
At dawn, Kevin finally catches up to the truck. He finds it sitting in the empty river basin he had been filming Iris near at the beginning of the film,  body parts strewn on the ground around it. He examines the driver's seat only to find it empty, with a pair of disembodied hands duct taped to the wheel. Upon examining the back of the truck, he finds a number of televisions stacked atop each other, as in the first two movies. Iris appears on one of the TV screens and demands that Kevin upload the footage to broadcasters and the internet as well. At first, he refuses, mentioning that the videos are causing people all over the city to go insane, but when Iris begins to brutally mutilate herself, he relents and pushes a button labeled "UPLOAD". With the deed done, he exits the truck as the image of Iris on the screen continues to taunt him. Outside, he discovers Iris, having actually been dead for some time, slumped against the truck with her cellphone stuck in her mouth. Kevin pulls the phone out of her mouth and sees that it is in selfie-mode. He stares in shock at himself on the screen with his nose bleeding, implying he is affected by the videos as well. The closing shot of the film, set to the finale from Beethoven's Ninth Symphony, is a view of the Los Angeles skyline, smoke billowing up, lights flickering on and off, and a helicopter circling overhead, revealing the uploaded videos have gone viral and have begun to affect thousands, thus fulfilling the grander threat introduced in the first two films.

Gorgeous Vortex 
 Directed by Todd Lincoln
 Written by Todd Lincoln
A surreal short with no dialogue that follows a sinister, shadowy organization that is tracking a serial killer.
Note: This short was cut at the last minute since it did not fit in with the overall theme of the film. (It was mostly cut due to not being a found-footage film). The short is included as an extra on the film's DVD and Blu-ray release, starting after the credits for the main film end.

Cast

Release
The film was released through Video on Demand on October 23, 2014, and was released in select theaters on November 21. The home-release on Blu-ray disc and DVD was on February 17, 2015, through Magnet Releasing. Magnet Releasing premiered the film on March 20, 2015, on Netflix Instant. It grossed $246,976 in home video sales.

Reception
On Rotten Tomatoes, the film holds a score of 33% and an average rating of 4.10/10 based on 33 reviews. The site's consensus reads, "V/H/S Viral is hardly a sensation as it cycles through the franchise's least frightening vignettes yet". Metacritic gives the film a score of 38/100 based on reviews from 12 critics, indicating "generally unfavorable reviews" from critics.  
Peter Debruge of Variety described the film as "three playful yet thoroughly disposable experiments in short-form p.o.v. cinema".  Frank Scheck of The Hollywood Reporter wrote, "Lacking the originality of the first film and the superior entries of the second, V/H/S Viral spirals downwards towards the same sort of obsolescence as the home video format that provides its title."  A. A. Dowd of The A.V. Club rated it D+ and called it "slapdash and ineffectual".  Jordan Hoffman of The Guardian rated it 1/5 stars and wrote, "Besides one bright spot involving razor-sharp genitals, this horror compilation is bereft of thrills, scares or creativity."  Shawn Macomber of Fangoria rated it 3/4 stars and wrote that the change in tone from previous entries in the film series will alienate some fans but is a "welcome breather".  Brad McHargue of Dread Central rated it 4/5 stars and wrote, "The shorts that comprise V/H/S Viral are inventive enough to make up for the blunder that is Sarmiento's wraparound, even if each one breaks the found footage 'rules' in egregious ways." Luke Owen of Flickering Myth writes “Dante the Great has some amazing visuals, a wickedly fun fight scene and an amazing style. Both Vigalondo's Parallel Monsters and Bishop's Dante the Great deserve to be in a much better anthology horror movie.”

Sequel 
In June 2020, it was announced that a reboot of the V/H/S franchise was in development, with a fourth installment titled V/H/S/94, written by David Bruckner. V/H/S/94 had its world premiere at Fantastic Fest on September 26, 2021, and opened to positive critical reviews, with the initial reactions being that it was a "return to form" for the series.

References

Further reading
 Icons of Fright Interview With V/H/S: VIRAL's “Bonestorm” directors, Benson/Moorhead
 AICN HORROR talks with all five directors from V/H/S VIRAL! Plus a review of the film!
 Exclusive V/H/S: Viral Interviews Part 1: Gregg Bishop, Justin Welborn, Nacho Vigalondo, Marcel Sarmiento
 V/H/S: Viral Interviews Part 2: Justin Benson and Aaron Moorhead

External links
 
 
 
 
 
 

2014 films
2014 horror films
American horror anthology films
American science fiction horror films
American supernatural horror films
American independent films
American sequel films
Demons in film
Found footage films
Screenlife films
Films about social media
Films about cults
Films about magic and magicians
Films about parallel universes
Mariticide in fiction
Films scored by Joseph Bishara
2010s English-language films
2010s American films
V/H/S (franchise)